The 2013 Slovenian Football Cup Final was the final match of the 2012–13 Slovenian Football Cup, the 22nd edition of the Slovenian Football Cup, the top knockout tournament of Slovenian football and the second most important football competition in the country after the Slovenian PrvaLiga championship. The match was played on 29 May 2013 at Bonifika Stadium in Koper.

Venue
The match was played at Bonifika Stadium, a 4,047 all-seater stadium in Koper, which replaced Arena Petrol, Ljudski vrt and Stožice Stadium, where the previous eight finals were held. In addition, this was the first Slovenian cup final held in the Slovene Riviera.

Background
The final was played between the two Styrian teams, Maribor and Celje, both competing in the Slovenian PrvaLiga. This was the second time Maribor and Celje met in the cup final, having faced each other in the final during the 2011–12 edition, where Maribor won their seventh cup title after a penalty shoot-out. Celje previously competed in six finals, but managed to win only once, when they defeated Gorica in the 2004–05 edition.

Road to the final

Note: In all results below, the score of the finalist is given first.

Match details

See also
2012–13 Slovenian Football Cup
2012–13 Slovenian PrvaLiga
2012 Slovenian Supercup

References
General

Specific

Cup
Slovenian Football Cup finals
Slovenian Football Cup Final 2013
Slovenian Football Cup Final 2013